The 1996–97 Phoenix Coyotes' season was the team's first season in the National Hockey League (NHL) since relocating from Winnipeg the season prior. The franchise's 25th season since its founding in 1972, and 18th season in the National Hockey League since 1979.

Off-season

Regular season

The Winnipeg Jets team was sold to Phoenix businessmen Steven Gluckstern and Richard Burke, and in 1996, the club moved to Arizona and became the Phoenix Coyotes.

In the summer that the move took place, the franchise saw the exit of Jets stars like Teemu Selanne and Alexei Zhamnov, while the team added established superstar Jeremy Roenick from the Chicago Blackhawks. Roenick teamed up with power wingers Keith Tkachuk and Rick Tocchet to form a dynamic 1–2–3 offensive punch that led the Coyotes through their first years in Arizona. Also impressive were young players like Shane Doan (the last remaining original Jet still active in the NHL), Oleg Tverdovsky and goaltender Nikolai Khabibulin, whom the fans nicknamed the "Bulin Wall."

Forward Keith Tkachuk was renamed captain, replacing Kris King.

Final standings

Schedule and results

Playoffs

In their first year, the Coyotes managed to make the playoffs. However, they lost to the Mighty Ducks of Anaheim 4 games to 3 in round one.

Anaheim Wins Series 4–3

Player statistics

Regular season
Scoring

Goaltending

Playoffs
Scoring

Goaltending

Note: GP = Games played; G = Goals; A = Assists; Pts = Points; +/- = Plus/minus; PIM = Penalty minutes; PPG=Power-play goals; SHG=Short-handed goals; GWG=Game-winning goals
      MIN=Minutes played; W = Wins; L = Losses; T = Ties; GA = Goals against; GAA = Goals against average; SO = Shutouts; SA=Shots against; SV=Shots saved; SV% = Save percentage;

Awards and records

Transactions

Trades

Waivers

Free agents

Joining the Coyotes:

Leaving the Coyotes:

Draft picks
Phoenix's draft picks at the 1996 NHL Entry Draft held at the Kiel Center in St. Louis, Missouri.

References
 Coyotes on Hockey Database

Arizona Coyotes seasons
P
P